Operation Avalanche was the codename for the combined US and British landings on the southwest coast of Italy on 9 September 1943 as part of the Allied effort in the Mediterranean Theater during World War II. The forces landed consisted of the US Fifth Army under Lieutenant General Mark W. Clark. The Fifth Army was made up of the British X Corps, which landed south of the town of Salerno, and the US VI Corps, which landed at the town of Paestum.

The landings were carried out by combined forces of the US Navy and Royal Navy, detailed below.

Naval losses: 2 destroyers, 1 minesweeper, 1 tug, 1 hospital ship

Order of battle

Task Force 80: Western Naval Task Force 
Vice Admiral H. Kent Hewitt, USN
 Embarking  US Fifth Army (Lt. Gen. Mark Wayne Clark, USA)
   1 amphibious force flagship: USS Ancon
   2 anti-aircraft/fighter director ships: HMS Ulster Queen, HMS Palomares
   1 submarine: HMS Shakespeare

Task Force 85: Northern Landing Force 
Commodore G.N. Oliver, RN
 Embarking  British X Corps (Lt. Gen. Richard L. McCreery, BA)
   2 amphibious force flagships: HMS Hilary, USS Biscayne
   4 light cruisers: HMS Mauritius, HMS ''Uganda, HMS Orion, HMS Delhi
   1 monitor: HMS Roberts
 18 destroyers: 17 British, 1 Greek
   7 minesweepers 
   4 tugs (1 sunk by air attack 13 September)
 13 transports and LSIs
 90 LSTs: 45 American, 45 British
 84 LCTs: 24 American, 60 British (5 sunk)
 96 LCI(L)s: 48 American, 48 British
 23 subchasers/wooden hull
 27 minecraft
 32 Motor Launches
 13 trawlers

Task Force 81: Southern Landing Force 
Rear Adm. John L. Hall, Jr., USN

 Embarking  US VI Corps (Maj. Gen. Ernest J. Dawley, USA)
 TG 81.5 – Fire Support Group (Rear Adm. Lyal A. Davidson)
   4 light cruisers: USS Philadelphia, USS Savannah, USS Boise, USS Brooklyn
   1 monitor: HMS Abercrombie
   4 destroyers (1 sunk by submarine 12 October)
 TG 81.6 – Screen (Capt. Charles Wellborn)
 12 destroyers (1 sunk by torpedo boat 10 September)
 TG 81.2 – Transport Group (Capt. C.D. Edgar)
 19 transports: 14 American, 5 British
   3 LSTs: all British
   6 scout boats
 TG 81.3 – Landing Craft Group (Capt. F.M. Adams)
 27 LSTs: 18 American, 9 British
 32 LCIs: 26 American, 6 British
   6 LCTs: all American
 TG 81.7 – Control Group (Cmdr. R.D. Lowther, USNR)
   8 subchasers/steel hull, 4 LCSs
 TG 81.8 – Minesweeper Group (Cmdr. A.H. Richards)
   9 minesweepers (1 sunk by submarine 25 September) 
 12 motor minesweepers
 TG 81.9 – Salvage Group (Lt. V.C. Kyllberg)
   2 tugs
 TG 80.2 – Picket Group (Lt. Cmdr. S.M. Barnes)
 16 PTs
 TG 80.3 – Diversion Group (Capt. C.L. Andrews)
   1 destroyer: USS Knight
   7 torpedo boats: 7 British MTBs, 1 American PT
   4 subchasers/wooden hull
   6 Motor Launches
 10 air/sea rescue craft

Task Force 88: Support Carrier Force 

Rear Admiral Sir Philip L. Vian, RN
   1 light carrier: 
   9 destroyers: 7 British, 2 Polish

Covering Forces
 2 fleet carriers (Rear Admiral C. Moody, RN)
 
 28 Grumman Martlet fighters
 10 Supermarine Seafire fighters 
 12 Fairey Barracuda torpedo bombers
 
 28 Grumman Martlet fighters
   5 Supermarine Seafire fighters
 12 Fairey Albacore torpedo bombers
 Force "H" (Vice Admiral Sir A.V. Willis, RN)
 Screen
 20 destroyers: 16 British, 1 Polish, 2 Dutch, 1 French 
 Auxiliaries
   3 hospital ships:  (sunk by air attack 13 September),

Notes

References

Sources 
 

Conflicts in 1943
World War II operations and battles of the Italian Campaign
Italy in World War II
World War II orders of battle